Anduki is a location in Brunei.

 For the location in the Belait District, including the Jubilee Recreation Park, see Seria
 For the heliport and airfield, see Anduki Airfield